Sir Harry Edward Augustus Twyford, KBE (1870 – 10 January 1967) was the Lord Mayor of London from 1937 to 1938.

References
Who Was Who

External links 

 

1870 births
1967 deaths
Knights Bachelor
20th-century lord mayors of London
Knights Commander of the Order of the British Empire
Aldermen of the City of London
Sheriffs of the City of London